Richard Henry Ronald Benyon, Baron Benyon  (born 21 October 1960) is a British politician who has served as Minister of State for Biosecurity, Marine and Rural Affairs since 2022. A member of the Conservative Party, he was Member of Parliament (MP) for Newbury from 2005 to 2019.

Benyon studied at the Royal Agricultural College and Royal Military Academy Sandhurst before serving in the British Army, being posted to Northern Ireland and the Far East with the Royal Green Jackets. He was elected to Newbury Council in 1991 and became Conservative group leader in 1994.

Benyon became MP for Newbury at the 2005 general election. In opposition, he served on the Home Affairs Select Committee, as an opposition whip and as a shadow minister for the Department for Environment, Food and Rural Affairs (DEFRA). Under David Cameron, he first served as a government minister at DEFRA from May 2010 to October 2013. He had the Conservative whip removed on 3 September 2019 by Prime Minister Boris Johnson, after voting against the government, and sat as an independent MP until he had the whip restored on 28 October 2019.

In December 2020, it was announced Benyon would be conferred a life peerage after a nomination by Prime Minister Boris Johnson. Following the resignation of Lord Gardiner of Kimble in May 2021, he was again made Parliamentary Under Secretary of State at the Department for Environment, Food and Rural Affairs.

Early life
Benyon was born on 21 October 1960 in Reading. He is the son of Sir William Richard Benyon, a Conservative Member of Parliament from 1970 until 1992, and is the great-great grandson of former Conservative Prime Minister Lord Salisbury. He was educated at nearby Bradfield College and the Royal Agricultural College.

Military service
Having attended the Royal Military Academy Sandhurst, he was commissioned into the Royal Green Jackets, British Army, as a second lieutenant on 8 August 1981. He was promoted to lieutenant on 8 August 1983.

During his four years' service, he was posted to Northern Ireland, the UK and the Far East. He transferred to the Regular Army Reserve of Officers on 8 August 1984, thereby ending his military career but maintaining call-up liability.

Political career
He was elected in 1991 to Newbury District Council, and became Conservative group leader in 1994, in opposition to the then-ruling Liberal Democrats. He lost his council seat in 1995.

House of Commons
Benyon contested the Newbury constituency at the 1997 general election but lost heavily to the 1993 by-election incumbent Liberal Democrat David Rendel. Benyon and Rendel contested Newbury again at the 2001 general election, and Rendel came out again as the victor with a reduced majority. He and Rendel again contested Newbury at the 2005 UK general election and Benyon was elected with a majority of 3,460, replacing Rendel.

Benyon made his maiden speech on 20 May 2005 and served on the Home Affairs Select Committee from 2005 to 2007, when he became an Opposition Whip. He was the Shadow Minister for the Environment, Food and Rural Affairs from 2009 until the 2010 general election when he entered government. He was also one of the first 15 MPs to support David Cameron's Conservative Party leadership bid.

In May 2009, he was listed by The Daily Telegraph as one of the "saints" in the expenses scandal exposed by that newspaper.

Benyon was made Parliamentary Under-Secretary of State at the Department for the Environment, Food and Rural Affairs in the first Cameron Ministry. and remained in post until a ministerial reshuffle in October 2013.

In 2012, while Wildlife Minister, Benyon refused a request from other MPs that possession of carbofuran, a deadly poison used to kill raptors that is banned in Canada and the European Union, should be made a criminal offence. Green Party MP Caroline Lucas was quoted as saying: "The minister's shocking refusal to outlaw the possession of a poison used only by rogue gamekeepers to illegally kill birds of prey would be inexplicable were it not for his own cosy links to the shooting lobby".

In December 2012, Benyon's neighbours complained when Hanson Aggregates were given permission to extract 200,000 tonnes of sand and gravel a year from woodlands on Benyon's family estate, leading it to be described as a 'bombsite'. Benyon said that the estate was controlled by a family trust.

In 2013, Benyon succeeded in preventing any cuts in fishing quotas. He said that if British fishermen had their quotas cut they would dump even more fish overboard, and the more fish they are allowed to catch, the better it will be for "the health of our seas". Back in 2004, the Royal Commission on Environmental Pollution proposed that 30% of the United Kingdom's waters should become reserves preventing fishing or any other kind of extraction.

Also in 2013, Benyon's policy relating to access to rivers and his role as an owner of fishing rights was criticised. Writing in The Guardian, George Monbiot wrote that Benyon "repeatedly wields his power in ways that promote his own interests" and being "so enmeshed in potential conflicts of interest that were he to recuse himself from all the issues in which he has a personal stake, he would have nothing to do but order the departmental paperclips".

In 2014, Benyon's family firm was part of a property consortium that purchased New Era estate, one of the last affordable housing estates for working-class Londoners. The consortium increased the rents and announced plans to increase them further to match the rest of the market, effectively displacing its current residents. Following negative publicity and protests by the tenants, Benyon Estate announced that it would sell its stake in the consortium back to the landlord, Westbrook Partners, a New York–based property investment company.

Benyon was opposed to Brexit prior to the 2016 European Union membership referendum. On 16 December 2016, he was appointed to the Privy Council of the United Kingdom.

In 2017, Benyon was accused of nepotism by Private Eye after he hired his sister as a part-time senior researcher in his office just before a parliamentary ban on such practices came into force. In 2019 he was one of 21 Conservative MPs who lost the whip for supporting the European Union (Withdrawal) (No. 2) Act 2019. He stood down in the general election called thereafter.

On 3 September 2019, Benyon - along with 20 other Conservative MPs - had the Conservative whip removed by Prime Minister Boris Johnson, after voting against the government and supporting an emergency motion to allow the House of Commons to undertake proceedings on the European Union (Withdrawal) (No. 6) Bill. Benyon sat as an independent MP until he had the Conservative whip restored on 28 October 2019.

Benyon stood down as Member of Parliament for Newbury at the 2019 United Kingdom general election.

House of Lords

In January 2021, Benyon was raised to the House of Lords by Prime Minister Boris Johnson, styled Baron Benyon, of Englefield in the Royal County of Berkshire.

On 13 May 2021, Lord Benyon was made Parliamentary Under-Secretary of State for Rural Affairs and Biosecurity, following the resignation of Lord Gardiner of Kimble. On 25 October 2022 Rishi Sunak promoted him and appointed him as a Minister of State at the Department for Environment, Food and Rural Affairs.

Philanthropy 
Benyon is a patron of the charity, Berkshire Vision, a charity dedicated to supported the visually impaired in the county.

Personal life

According to The Sunday Times Rich List in 2019, Benyon is worth £130 million. He controls the Englefield Estate, a 14,000 acre estate of mainly rural land and property in West Berkshire and Hampshire between Reading, Newbury and Basingstoke. It is the largest private landowner in West Berkshire. The family seat is Englefield House, a large Grade II* Listed building owned by the Benyon family for many generations. He also owns the Glenmazeran Estate in Inverness, Scotland. 

According to The Register of Members' Financial Interests, as at 21 January 2019, he was paid £15,000 per annum by the UK Water Partnership, a not-for-profit company set up to promote the interests of the UK water sector; and employed his sister, Catherine Haig, as a part-time researcher while an MP. He received donations amounting to £8,250 in 2018, from Philip Lavallin Wroughton (three payments amounting to £7,000) and from Chris Gent (a single payment of £1,250).

In December 2017, Benyon was banned from driving for six months after admitting to using a mobile phone while driving. He had previously spoken out against mobile phone-using drivers after four people were killed by a distracted driver in an accident in his constituency.

Benyon is one of nine Vice-Presidents of Berkshire County Scout Council.

Ancestry

Notes

References

External links

Richard Benyon MP Conservative Party profile

1960 births
Living people
Royal Green Jackets officers
UK MPs 2005–2010
Conservative Party (UK) MPs for English constituencies
Independent members of the House of Commons of the United Kingdom
People educated at Bradfield College
People from Englefield, Berkshire
People from Reading, Berkshire
Alumni of the Royal Agricultural University
UK MPs 2010–2015
UK MPs 2015–2017
Councillors in Berkshire
21st-century British landowners
Benyon family
Members of the Privy Council of the United Kingdom
UK MPs 2017–2019
Life peers created by Elizabeth II